Delta is an American sitcom television series starring Delta Burke that aired on ABC from September 15, 1992 to August 25, 1993. It was a new starring vehicle for Burke, as her return to television following her dismissal from the CBS sitcom Designing Women  in the spring of 1991.

Synopsis
Burke portrays Delta Bishop, a young woman with dreams of writing and singing country music. She became a hairstylist at Mona's House of Hair, married Charlie Bishop and thought she had found happiness. After eight years of marriage, she became restless: she was eager to follow in the footsteps of her childhood idol, Patsy Cline, and become a country music star. She quits her job, leaves her husband and friends behind, and travels to Nashville, Tennessee. There, she finds an apartment over the garage of a home owned by her cousin, Lavonne Overton (Gigi Rice), and her husband, Buck (Bill Engvall). She also finds a job waiting tables at The Green Lantern, a local bar that hosts an amateur night which she believes that if she could sing her songs there, it could jumpstart her career.

Burke, most popular for her role as Suzanne Sugarbaker on Designing Women, reportedly utilized her own singing talents for the role of Bishop, and dyed her familiar brunette hair blonde to play the role. The theme song was "Climb That Mountain High" by Reba McEntire which was not a charted single; the tune was featured on Reba's 1990 MCA album Rumor Has It.

Cast
 Delta Burke as Delta Bishop
 Earl Holliman as Darden Towe
 Gigi Rice as Lavonne Overton
 Bill Engvall as Buck Overton
 Beth Grant as Thelma Wainwright
 Nancy Giles as Connie Morris
 Joe Urla as Sandy Scott

Episodes

Broadcast history 
The sitcom premiered September 15, 1992, to healthy ratings following Roseanne. It then moved to Thursday nights opposite FOX's The Simpsons, and ratings began to sink. It was pulled from the schedule in December 1992 and returned to ABC the following spring 1993 for six episodes before finally being canceled. In an attempt to infuse ratings, the show was moved back to Tuesdays after Roseanne, and Burke brought her brunette hair back that spring (even refilming the opening credits to correspond with the change in hair color), in the sake of familiarity, but these changes proved to be too little, too late. It would rank 72nd for the season with an average 9.6 rating.

Award nominations
Earl Holliman was nominated for Best Performance by an Actor in a Supporting Role in a Series, Miniseries or Television Film at the 50th Golden Globe Awards in 1992.

References

External links 
 
 Delta at epguides.com

1992 American television series debuts
1993 American television series endings
1990s American musical comedy television series
1990s American sitcoms
American Broadcasting Company original programming
Television shows set in Tennessee
Television series by Universal Television